Housden is a surname. Notable people with the surname include:

Fred Housden (1892–1974), English athletics coach
Jak Housden (born 1969), Australian musician
James Housden (1904–1994), Australian Anglican bishop
Leslie Housden (1894–1963), English medical doctor and long-distance runner
Peter Housden (born 1950), British government officer